Centerville is a town in Hickman County, Tennessee, United States. The population was 3,489 as of the 2020 Census. It is the county seat and the only incorporated town in Hickman County. It is best known for being the hometown of American comedian Minnie Pearl.

Geography
Centerville sits at the center of Hickman County in the valley of the Duck River, a west-flowing tributary of the Tennessee River.

Transportation
Tennessee State Route 100 is the main road running the length of the town. It leads northeast  to Nashville, the state capital, and southwest  to Linden. Tennessee State Route 50 passes through the southern part of Centerville, leading northwest  to Interstate 40 (via exit 148) near Only and southeast  to Columbia. The town limits extend north  from the town center along SR 100 to the formerly unincorporated community of Fairfield, where State Route 48 leads northwest  to Interstate 40 at Exit 163.

Centerville and Hickman County are served by Centerville Municipal Airport (IATA code GHM), a city-owned public-use airport located three miles (5 km) north of downtown.

Demographics

2020 census

As of the 2020 United States census, there were 3,532 people, 1,415 households, and 832 families residing in the town.

2000 census
As of the census of 2000, there were 3,793 people, 1,563 households, and 997 families residing in the town. The population density was 348.4 people per square mile (134.5/km2). There were 1,688 housing units at an average density of 155.0 per square mile (59.8/km2). The racial makeup of the town was 93.51% White, 4.77% African American, 0.37% Native American, 0.03% Asian, 0.24% from other races, and 1.08% from two or more races. Hispanic or Latino of any race were 0.90% of the population.

There were 1,563 households, out of which 27.3% had children under the age of 18 living with them, 48.3% were married couples living together, 11.8% had a female householder with no husband present, and 36.2% were non-families. 34.3% of all households were made up of individuals, and 19.4% had someone living alone who was 65 years of age or older. The average household size was 2.28 and the average family size was 2.89.

In the town, the population was spread out, with 21.1% under the age of 18, 7.6% from 18 to 24, 25.3% from 25 to 44, 23.3% from 45 to 64, and 22.7% who were 65 years of age or older. The median age was 42 years. For every 100 females, there were 86.8 males. For every 100 females age 18 and over, there were 80.3 males.

The median income for a household in the town was $24,824, and the median income for a family was $35,448. Males had a median income of $29,693 versus $20,688 for females. The per capita income for the town was $14,947. About 15.1% of families and 20.7% of the population were below the poverty line, including 31.1% of those under age 18 and 21.6% of those age 65 or over.

Government
Centerville is governed by a mayor, vice mayor, and a board of 10 aldermen. It uses the council-manager government style of government. The mayor is elected to a four-year term. Each alderman represents one of five wards and is elected to a four-year term. Aldermen elections are staggered every two years, with one alderman from each ward being elected in each election. The vice mayor is selected from the board of aldermen.

The current mayor is Gary Jacobs. The current vice mayor is Derek Newsom. The current Board of Aldermen consists of:

* designates vice mayor. Term expiration dates in parenthesis.

Notable people
Notable people who were born in Centerville or lived in the community include:
Dan Griner, baseball pitcher who played professionally from 1912 to 1918
Kevin Max, solo musician and founding member of DC Talk, briefly ran a bed and breakfast and recording studio in Centerville
Minnie Pearl, An American comedian. born Sarah Ophelia Colley in Centerville.
William K. Sebastian, Centerville native who represented Arkansas in the United States Senate
Mike Smithson, major league baseball player
John Spence, America's first "Frogman"
Dicky Wells, jazz trombonist

Climate
The climate in this area is characterized by hot, humid summers and generally mild to cool winters.  According to the Köppen Climate Classification system, Centerville has a humid subtropical climate, abbreviated "Cfa" on climate maps.

See also
Grinder's Switch, Tennessee

References

External links

Town of Centerville official website
Town charter

Towns in Hickman County, Tennessee
Towns in Tennessee
County seats in Tennessee